Doing business as STAR Institute the STAR Center Foundation (formerly known as the Sensory Processing Disorder Foundation and the KID Foundation) is a registered 501(c)3, nonprofit organization dedicated to treatment, research and education related to sensory integration and processing. 

The first iteration of STAR Institute was founded in 1979 by Dr. Lucy Jane Miller the Director Emeritus who retired in October 2019. The foundation was funded by U.S. Public Health Service division of Maternal and Child Health (MCH).  The Wallace Research Foundation was attracted by the foundation in 1995 and helped fund the development of a psychophysiology research laboratory to study SPD. 

The mission of STAR Institute (the STAR Center Foundation) is: To impact quality of life by developing and promoting best practices for sensory health and wellness through treatment, education, and research. 

For many years a primary focus of the foundation was to get sensory processing disorder added to the American Psychiatric Association's Diagnostic and Statistical Manual of Mental Disorders.
Sensory Processing Disorder was defined as "a complex disorder of the brain that affects developing children and adults". Currently Sensory Processing Disorder or SPD is defined as "differences in sensory integration and processing that prevent function and participation in day-to-day life". SPD remains poorly recognized.

Services and programs

The STAR Institute philosophy on sensory integration and processing incorporates an intentional focus on regulation and relationships. The STAR Frame of Reference is relevant across the lifespan, and applicable to developmental and behavioral diagnoses.

STAR Institute has three areas of focus: Research, Education, and Treatment, which co-exist as three mutually supportive teams working in one center.

STAR Treatment Department 
The STAR Institute treatment department utilizes the STAR Frame of Reference an interdisciplinary approach to the provision of meaningful supports for differences in sensory integration and processing. The team includes occupational therapists, speech and language therapists, psychologists, counselors, a pediatrician and a dietician. STAR Institute occupational therapy sessions have fidelity to the Ayres Sensory Integration frame of reference. STAR Institute provides services through the lifespan with a dedicated adult and adolescent team. They also have a specialist feeding team.

STAR Education Department 
The STAR Institute education department offers many services and programs, including mentorship opportunities, as well as online resources, classes and webinars. These programs are designed for professional, parents, and are offered to anyone that is interested in learning more about sensory challenges and potential solutions.

STAR Online Learning 

Formerly known as the Sensory Processing Disorder University, the STAR Online Learning platform was developed by the SPD Foundation to provide e-Learning opportunities for anyone wishing to learn more about sensory integration and processing. They offer multiple online courses for purchase that feature videos of children during treatment, strategies for intervention, and real-life parents stories. All courses are eligible for Continuing Education Units (CEUs) from the American Occupational Therapy Association.

STAR Research Department 
The STAR Institute Research Center provides the basis for the education and treatment programs, demonstrating the effectiveness of sensory integration therapy. For 22 years (1995-2017) sensory integration and processing was researched by an Interdisciplinary university-based research group spearheaded by STAR Institute with support from the Wallace Research Foundation. The project involved ~50 scientists from the fields of neuroscience, epidemiology, genetics, intervention, and neuropathology. Outcomes from the neuroscientific and behavioral studies have been published in > 100 peer-reviewed articles. The scientific findings of the group demonstrate brain differences between neuromajority individuals and those who have sensory challenges including significant differences in autonomic functioning, white matter in the posterior brain, and multisensory integration. Research drives advocacy initiatives that promote recognition of sensory processing challenges.

Resources

STAR Institute offers a wealth of sensory processing disorder resources; including current research, news, articles and reports, links to parent connection groups, as well as advocacy information and supporting flyers. Page text.

Treatment directory

STAR Institute offers help finding service providers. Intended to assist individuals and families in locating professionals that may help serve important needs, the options range from dentists to occupational therapists, among many others.

See also
Sensory friendly

References

Mental health organizations in Colorado
Neurological disorders
Organizations established in 1979
Sensory accommodations
Non-profit organizations based in the United States